Newsweek Selecciones was an Argentine weekly magazine, a local edition of Newsweek. It used material from Newsweek En Español and Newsweek Argentina (part of the articles are written by the Argentine bureau located in Buenos Aires, and part is a  reproduction of international material). Its editorial director was Alex Milberg.

It started in 2010, and belonged to Sergio Szpolski's media group.

Staff 

Damián Cotarelo, general coordinator

Sections 
 World Vision
 Panorama
 Last Word

References

2010 establishments in Argentina
News magazines published in Argentina
Defunct magazines published in Argentina
Magazines established in 2010
Magazines with year of disestablishment missing
Newsweek
Spanish-language magazines
Weekly magazines